The Bassan-Gué BN4 was a French night bomber designed in 1918 to the BN3/4 specification from the STAe. This large triplane bomber was to have been powered by three  Renault 12H engines, but these were unavailable. Resorting to three  Hispano-Suiza 8Fb engines left the prospective design seriously under-powered and development was abandoned.

References

1910s French bomber aircraft
Military aircraft of World War I
Triplanes
Aircraft manufactured in France
Aircraft first flown in 1918
Three-engined aircraft